The Australian emperor dragonfly,
also known as the yellow emperor dragonfly,
scientific name Anax papuensis, is a species of dragonfly in the Aeshnidae family. 
It is black with yellow dots along its tail.

Description

The Australian emperor is a very large dragonfly, up to 70 mm long. Its abdomen is marked boldly in black and yellow. The thorax is greenish-grey. The head is yellow with a T-shaped mark on the forehead (frons). The eyes are yellow-green. The leading edges of the wings are yellow. The insect habitually hunts fairly slowly, patrolling up and down like other hawkers, with short bursts at high speed.

Males and females are similar.

Distribution and habitat
The Australian emperor is found throughout Australia. In the state of Victoria, it has a split distribution: below about 600 metres in altitude, and above about 1200 metres, apparently because it avoids forested areas. It is also found in New Zealand, New Guinea, the Cocos-Keeling Islands, Java, Sumba and New Caledonia.

The Australian emperor is widespread and common on larger bodies of water with tall vegetation on the banks. Like other hawkers, it may hunt far from water. It flies throughout the summer from September to May.

Behaviour

The Australian emperor is notable as the dragonfly in which motion camouflage was studied by Mizutani et al.: males of Anax papuensis are fiercely territorial, and approach and attack rivals, the males choose a flight path that keeps their image as seen by the target still with respect to a landmark point. The attacking dragonfly thus looms larger in the target's eyes, but otherwise does not seem to move until it is very close.

The males are very protective of their females. In case of intrusion of another individual, he will drive it away by engaging in a series of noisy air battles. Females lay their eggs under water.

Gallery

Bibliography

 Günther Theischinger and John Hawking. The Complete Field Guide to Dragonflies of Australia. CSIRO Publishing, 2006.

See also
 List of dragonflies of Australia

References

External links

 Brisbane Dragons
 Esperance Fauna

Aeshnidae
Insects of Australia
Insects described in 1839